A Global Affair is a 1964 American comedy film directed by Jack Arnold, and starring Bob Hope, Michèle Mercier, Yvonne De Carlo, and Elga Andersen.

Plot

A baby is abandoned at the United Nations headquarters in New York by a mother who heard the UN's Frank Larrimore speak out on behalf of children's rights via a radio show. Found by UN guide Lisette, she brings the baby to the security office.

Because the baby is in international territory, her nationality unknown, Frank (a proud bachelor) is begrudgingly forced to take the baby back to his apartment until a proper home can be found. His landlord forbids kids, so Frank smuggles the child into his apartment.

Lisette initially finds Frank to be abrasive and unfit to take care of a child, and believes Frank and his pal Randy are using it as a way to meet beautiful, wedding-minded single women. But, Lisette eventually reads his proposal for the "Universal Rights of a Child', and they fall in love. After a series of mishaps, Frank finally earns her forgiveness and love, and they adopt the baby.

Cast
 Bob Hope as Frank Larrimore
 Michèle Mercier as Lisette
 Robert Sterling as Randy
 Yvonne De Carlo as Dolores
 Elga Andersen as Yvette
 Miiko Taka as Fumiko
 Lilo Pulver as Sonya
 John McGiver as Mr. Snifter
 Nehemiah Persoff as Segura
 Jacques Bergerac as Duval
 Mickey Shaughnessy as Police Officer Dugan
 Rafer Johnson as Ambassador
 Adlai Stevenson as himself
 Hugh Downs as himself

External links
 
 

1964 films
1964 comedy films
American black-and-white films
American comedy films
1960s English-language films
Films directed by Jack Arnold
Films set in New York City
Films shot in New York City
Metro-Goldwyn-Mayer films
Films with screenplays by Charles Lederer
Films about the United Nations
Films about orphans
1960s American films